Solid Gold 69 is the thirty-eighth studio album by American guitarist Chet Atkins, released in 1969.

The liner notes were written by Donovan.

Reception

The album was a moderate commercial success, entering the US Pop Album charts on December 13, 1969.  It stayed on the chart for 7 weeks and peaked at #150.

At the Grammy Awards of 1970, Solid Gold 69 was nominated for the Grammy Award for Best Country Instrumental Performance.

Writing for Allmusic, critic Richard S.  Ginell wrote of the album "Only completists who must hear everything need search for this."

Track listing

Side one
 "Both Sides Now" (Joni Mitchell)
 "Son of a Preacher Man" (John Hurley, Ronnie Wilkins)
 "My Way" (Claude François, Jacques Revaux, Paul Anka)
 "Blackbird" (Lennon–McCartney)
 "I'll Never Fall in Love Again" (Burt Bacharach, Hal David)
 "So What's New?" (Lee, Pisano)

Side two
 "Folsom Prison Blues" (Johnny Cash)
 "Jean"
 "Love Theme from Romeo and Juliet"
 "Hey Jude" (Lennon–McCartney)
 "Aquarius" (Galt MacDermot, James Rado, Gerome Ragni)

Personnel
Chet Atkins – guitar

Production notes
Produced by Bob Ferguson
Cover Photo by Howard Cooper
Liner Photo by Bill Grine
Sculptor:  Marvin Thompson

References

1969 albums
Chet Atkins albums
Albums produced by Bob Ferguson (music)
RCA Victor albums